Emergency Call  is an Australian factual television series on the Seven Network. It follows emergency telephone workers as they field calls and dispatch emergency responders. This series, unlike Ambulance Australia, is based in Melbourne, Victoria, Australia (police and ambulance) and Brisbane, Queensland, Australia (ambulance only). The series is based on the Belgian French series Emergency Call with local versions of the format also produced by Germany's VOX, the Netherlands EO/NPO1, Italy's RAI2 and C8 in France.

Episodes

Season 1 (2018)

See also
 Paramedics
 Ambulance Australia
 Ambulance

References

Seven Network original programming
2018 Australian television series debuts
2018 Australian television series endings
Australian factual television series
English-language television shows
Emergency communication